Sasse is the stage name used by Finnish electronic music producer Klas Lindblad. Based out of Berlin, Germany since 1999, Lindblad has also recorded under the monikers Freestyle Man, Cocamoto Exclusivo, Morris Brown, Sassomatic, Thirsty Monk and Winston Fletcher. He was also a member of electronic act Mr. Negative. Sasse's base-genre falls into the IDM category but also incorporates the styles of house music, electro, techno, Giorgio Moroder-influenced disco and Italo disco.

After several singles released as a remixer (many on his own Moodmusic record label), Sasse released his debut full-length album Made Within the Upper Stairs of Heaven in May 2006. He has also contributed writing and production work to Tracey Thorn's 2007 album Out of the Woods.

In a recent interview, Sasse explained that his music production style became much more raw over the years after he had spent many long nights cleaning his tracks until they lost some of their 'raw' character.

Discography

Albums
 2006 Made Within the Upper Stairs of Heaven
 2008 Toinen
 2012 Third Encounter

References

 De:Bug Musik » UR Wedding feat. Sasse
 Electronic Beats - Tech Talk: Klas 'Sasse' Lindblad 
 KontaktBar: Brett Johnson og Sasse – Natteliv | AOK
 Kontaktbar: Sasse og Marc Schneider – Natteliv | AOK

Further reading
 Athens 24 – Clubbing > Preview
 RA: Sasse biography

External links
 [ Allmusic.com: Artist overview]

Finnish electronic musicians
Finnish electro musicians
Intelligent dance musicians
Remixers
Living people
Year of birth missing (living people)